The Bolshaya Gorevaya is a river in Perm Krai, Russia, a left tributary of Turka which in turn is a tributary of Iren.

References 

Rivers of Perm Krai